Pablo Damián Crer (born 12 June 1989) is an Argentine professional volleyball player. He was part of the Argentina national team in 2010–2021, and a participant at the Olympic Games (London 2012, Rio 2016). At the professional club level, he plays for Paris Volley.

Career

Clubs
Crer started playing volleyball in Rosario for the team Sonder, a Santa Fe club that grows and develops talented players.

Honours

Clubs
 CSV South American Club Championship
  Montes Claros 2017 – with Bolívar Vóley

 National championships
 2014/2015  Argentine Cup, with Bolívar Vóley
 2016/2017  Argentine Championship, with Bolívar Vóley
 2018/2019  Argentine Championship, with Bolívar Vóley

Youth national team
 2006  CSV U19 South American Championship
 2008  CSV U21 South American Championship
 2008  CSV U19 South American Championship

Individual awards
 2016: FIVB Club World Championship – Best Middle Blocker
 2017: CSV South American Club Championship – Best Middle Blocker 
 2017: Pan American Cup – Best Middle Blocker

References

External links

 Player profile at LegaVolley.it  
 Player profile at PlusLiga.pl   
 Player profile at Volleybox.net 

1989 births
Living people
Sportspeople from Rosario, Santa Fe
Argentine men's volleyball players
Olympic volleyball players of Argentina
Volleyball players at the 2012 Summer Olympics
Volleyball players at the 2016 Summer Olympics
Volleyball players at the 2011 Pan American Games
Volleyball players at the 2015 Pan American Games
Pan American Games medalists in volleyball
Medalists at the 2011 Pan American Games
Medalists at the 2015 Pan American Games
Pan American Games gold medalists for Argentina
Pan American Games bronze medalists for Argentina
Argentine expatriate sportspeople in Italy
Expatriate volleyball players in Italy
Argentine expatriate sportspeople in Poland
Expatriate volleyball players in Poland
Argentine expatriate sportspeople in France
Expatriate volleyball players in France
Trefl Gdańsk players
Paris Volley players
Middle blockers
21st-century Argentine people